is a Japanese long-distance runner.

He finished thirteenth in the marathon at the 2007 World Championships.

International competitions

Personal bests
5000 metres - 13:57.71 min (2007)
10,000 metres - 28:32.00 min (2006)
Half marathon - 1:02:53 hrs (2005)
Marathon - 2:09:43 hrs (2004)

References

1981 births
Living people
Japanese male long-distance runners
Japanese male marathon runners
Asian Games competitors for Japan
Athletes (track and field) at the 2010 Asian Games
World Athletics Championships athletes for Japan
Japan Championships in Athletics winners